Konstantinos "Kostas" Missas (alternate spelling: Constandinos, Costas) (Greek: Κωνσταντίνος "Κώστας" Μίσσας; born August 15, 1953 in Greece) is a Greek former professional basketball player, and current professional basketball coach. He is currently the head coach of Olympiacos women basketball team. He also coached the Greece men's national basketball team at the 2017 FIBA EuroBasket. During his playing career, he was nicknamed "The General".

Playing career

Club playing career
In his club playing career, Missas played with the Greek clubs Panionios (1968–1986, 1988–1989), and Panathinaikos (1986–1988). With Panionios, he won the Greek 2nd Division twice, in 1974 and 1981. With Panionios, he also played in the European-wide 3rd-tier level league, the FIBA Korać Cup.

He also played in the Greek Cup final in 1977, while with Panionios. With Panathinaikos, he played in the European-wide 2nd-tier level league, the FIBA European Cup Winners' Cup (later called FIBA Saporta Cup). In his club career, he scored a total of 5,005 points, in 325 games played, for a scoring average of 15.4 points per game, in Greece's top-tier level Greek Basket League.

Greece men's national team
Missas played with Greek junior national team at the 1972 FIBA Europe Under-18 Championship. Missas was also a member of the Greece men's national basketball team. He played with Greece at the 1984 Summer Olympics qualification tournament. In total, he played with Greece's senior national team in 45 games.

Coaching career

Club coaching career
In his head coaching career, Missas has coached the following club teams: Panionios, Peristeri, Papagou, Apollon Patras, Dafnis, KAOD, Panionios, and AGE Chalkida.

National teams coaching career
Missas has been the head coach of the senior men's Cypriot national basketball team, the senior Greek women's national basketball team, and the Greek men's national under-20 basketball team. While coaching the Greek men's Under-20 national team, he won the gold medal at the 2009 FIBA Europe Under-20 Championship, and the silver medal at the 2010 FIBA Europe Under-20 Championship.

In June 2017, he became the head coach of the Greece men's national basketball team. He coached Greece at the EuroBasket 2017, where he reached the quarterfinal stage, eventually losing the ticket to the semifinals to Russia.

References

External links
FIBA Player Profile (archive)
FIBA Europe Coach Profile
Eurobasket.com Coach Profile
BolerBasket.no Coach Profile
Hellenic Basketball Federation Player Profile 
Hellenic Basketball Federation Coach Profile 

1953 births
Living people
AGEH Gymnastikos B.C. coaches
Apollon Patras B.C. coaches
Dafni B.C. coaches
Greece national basketball team coaches
Greek basketball coaches
Greek expatriates in Cyprus
Greek men's basketball players
KAOD B.C. coaches
Olympiacos Women's Basketball coaches
Panathinaikos B.C. players
Panionios B.C. coaches
Panionios B.C. players
Papagou B.C. coaches
Peristeri B.C. coaches